Miroslav Celler (7 May 1991 – 7 January 2023) was a Slovak professional squash player. He reached a career-high world ranking of World No. 178 in April 2015. 

Celler was raised in Bratislava's municipal borough of Petržalka. Celler was an alumni of Haanova Street Gymnázium and he graduated from Slovak University of Technology. He specialised in sustainable planning and landscaping. Prior to his death, he worked with Ministry of Justice to implement judicial reform and modernise courthouse infrastructure under Next Generation EU recovery and resilience plans. Celler died on 7 January 2023, after falling down a staircase at a Bratislava nightclub. He was 31.

References

External links 

1991 births
2023 deaths
Slovak male squash players
Sportspeople from Bratislava
Slovak University of Technology in Bratislava alumni